This is a  List of leaders of dependent territories in 2020

Argentina 

  (claimed territory)
 administered by the Governor of Tierra del Fuego, Antarctica, and the Islands of the South Atlantic Province of the Argentine Republic
 the Argentinian Antarctic claim has not been recognized by the United Nations, US, Russia, or by most other countries

Australia 
  Ashmore and Cartier Islands (uninhabited territory) 
 administered by Australian Assistant Minister for Regional Development and Territories
  Australian Antarctic Territory (territory)
 administered by the Australian Antarctic Division of the ministry of Environment
 the Australian Antarctic claim has not been recognized by the United Nations, US, Russia, or by most other countries
	
  (territory)
 Administrator – Natasha Griggs, Administrator of Christmas Island (2017–present)	
 President of Shire – Gordon Thomson, President of the Christmas Island Shire Council (2013–present)
  (territory)
 Administrator – Natasha Griggs, Administrator of Cocos Island (2017–present) 
 President of the Shire – Aindil Minkom,  President of the Shire Council of Cocos Island (2019–present)
  Coral Sea Islands (uninhabited territory)
 administered by Australian Assistant Minister for Regional Development and Territories
  Heard Island and McDonald Islands (uninhabited territory)
 administered by the Australian Antarctic Division of the Ministry of Environment
  (unincorporated, self-governed, area of New South Wales)
 Chairman of the Board – Anissa Levy, Chairman of the Lord Howe Island Board (2019–2021)
  Macquarie Island (uninhabited territory of Tasmania)
 administered by the Park and Wildlife Service of the Tasmanian ministry for Environment, Parks and Heritage
  (territory)
 Administrator – Eric Hutchinson, Administrator of Norfolk Island (2017–present)
 General Manager –
Bruce Taylor, Acting General Manager of Norfolk Island (2019–2020)
Andrew Roach, General Manager of Norfolk Island (2020–present)
 Mayor – Robin Adams, Mayor of Norfolk Island (2016–2021)
Torres Strait Islands (territory with a special status fitting the native land rights)
 Chairperson of the Regional Authority – Pedro Stephen Napau, Chairperson of the Torres Strait Regional Authority (2016–present)

Brazil 
  Brazilian Antarctica (Unofficially claimed territory)
 Chairman of the National Commission on Antarctic Matters (Minister of External Relations of Brazil) – Ernesto Araújo, Chairman of the Brazilian National Commission on Antarctic Matters (2019–2021)
 the Brazilian Antarctic are only a proposed claim

Chile 
  (claimed territory)
 Governor of Province – Nelson Isaac Cárcamo Barrera, Governor of Antártica Chilena Province (2019–2021)
 the Chilean Antarctic claim has not been recognized by the United Nations, US, Russia, or by most other countries
	
  (territory)
 Governor of Province – Laura Tarita Alarcón Rapu, Governor of Easter Island Province (2018–2021)
 Mayor – Pero Edmunds Paoa, Mayor of Easter Island (2012–present)

People's Republic of China (PRC) 
  (special administrative region)
 Chief Executive – Carrie Lam, Chief Executive of Hong Kong (2017–2022)
  (special administrative region)
 Chief Executive – Ho Iat Seng, Chief Executive of Macau (2019–present)

Denmark 
  (autonomous territory) 
 High Commissioner – Lene Moyell Johansen, High Commissioner of the Faroe Islands (2017–present)
 Prime Minister - Bárður á Steig Nielsen, Prime Minister of the Faroe Islands (2019–present)
  (autonomous territory)
 High Commissioner – Mikaela Engell, High Commissioner of Greenland (2011–present)
 Prime Minister – Kim Kielsen, Prime Minister of Greenland (2014–2021)

Ecuador 
  (province)
 Governor and Chairman of the Governing Council – Norman Wray, Governor and Chairman of the Governing Council with Special Regime of Galapagos Island (2019–2021)

Finland 
  (autonomous region)
 Governor – Peter Lindbäck, Governor of Åland Islands (1999–present)
 Premier – Veronica Thörnroos, Premier of Åland Islands (2019–present)

France 
  Bassas da India (uninhabited territory)
 administered by the administrator of the Territory of the French Southern and Antarctic Lands
  Clipperton Island (uninhabited territory)
 administered by the French minister of Overseas France through the high commissioner of the Republic in French Polynesia
  Europa Island (uninhabited territory)
 administered by the administrator of the Territory of the French Southern and Antarctic Lands
  (Guyane) (overseas  and region)
 Prefect –
Marc Del Grande, – Prefect of French Guiana (2019–2020)
Paul-Marie Claudon, – Acting Prefect of French Guiana (2020)
Thierry Queffelec, – Prefect of French Guiana (2020–present)
 President of the Territorial Authority – Rodolphe Alexandre, President of the Territorial Authority of Guyane (2015–2031)
  (overseas country)
 High Commissioner - Dominique Sorain, High Commissioner of French Polynesia (2019–present)
 President – Édouard Fritch, President of French Polynesia (2014–present) 
  (overseas territory)
 Administrator-Superior –
Évelyne Decorps, Administrator Superior of French Southern and Antarctic Lands (2018–2020)
Thierry Dousset, Acting Administrator Superior of French Southern and Antarctic Lands (2020)
Charles Giusti, Administrator Superior of French Southern and Antarctic Lands (2020–present)
 the French Antarctic claim (Adélie Land) has not been recognized by the United Nations, US, Russia, or by most other countries 
	
  Glorioso Islands (uninhabited territory)
 administered by the administrator of the Territory of the French Southern and Antarctic Lands
  (overseas  and region)
 Prefect –
Philippe Gustin, Prefect of Guadeloupe (2018–2020)
Virginie Klès, Acting Prefect of Guadeloupe (2020)
Alexandre Rochatte, Prefect of Guadeloupe (2020–present)
 President of the Regional Council – Ary Chalus, President of the Regional Council of Guadeloupe (2015–present)
 President of the Departmental Council – Josette Borel-Lincertin, President of the Departmental Council of Guadeloupe (2015–2021)
  Juan de Nova Island (uninhabited territory)  
 administered by the administrator of the Territory of the French Southern and Antarctic Lands
  (overseas  and region) 
 Prefect –
Franck Robine, Prefect of Martinique (2017–2020)
Antoine Poussier, Acting Prefect of Martinique (2020)
Stanislas Cazelles, Prefect of Martinique (2020–present) 
 President of the Executive Council – Alfred Marie-Jeanne, President of the Executive Council of Martinique (2015–2021)
  (overseas  and region) 
 Prefect – Jean-François Colombet, – Prefect of Mayotte (2019–2021)
 President of the Departmental Council – Soibahadine Ibrahim Ramadani, President of the Departmental Council of Mayotte (2015–2021)
  (overseas country)
 High Commissioner – Laurent Prévost, High Commissioner of New Caledonia (2019–2021)
 President of the Government – Thierry Santa, President of the Government of New Caledonia (2019–2021)
  Réunion (overseas  and region)
 Prefect – Jacques Billant, Prefect of Réunion (2019–present) 
 President of the Regional Council – Didier Robert, President of the Regional Council of Réunion (2010–2021)
 President of the Departmental Council – Cyrille Melchior, President of the Departmental Council of Réunion (2017–present)
  (Territorial collectivity)
 Prefect – the prefect of Guadeloupe has also been state representative in Saint Barthélemy since 2007
 Prefect-delegated –
Sylvie Daniélo-Feucher, Prefect delegated of Saint-Barthélemy and Saint-Martin (2018–2020)
Mikaël Doré, Acting Prefect delegated of Saint-Barthélemy and Saint-Martin (2020)
Serge Gouteyron, Prefect delegated of Saint-Barthélemy and Saint-Martin (2020–present)  
 President of the Territorial Council – Bruno Magras, President of the Territoria Council of Saint-Barthélemy (2007–present) 
  Saint-Martin (Territorial collectivity)
 Prefect – the prefect of Guadeloupe has also been state representative in Saint Martin since 2007
 Prefect-delegated –  
Sylvie Daniélo-Feucher, Prefect delegated of Saint-Barthélemy and Saint-Martin (2018–2020)
Mikaël Doré, Acting Prefect delegated of Saint-Barthélemy and Saint-Martin (2020)
Serge Gouteyron, Prefect delegated of Saint-Barthélemy and Saint-Martin (2020–present)
 President of the Territorial Council – Daniel Gibbs, President of the Territoria Council of Saint-Martin (2017–present)
  (overseas collectivity)
 Prefect – Thierry Devimeux, Prefect of Saint-Pierre and Miquelon (2018–2021)
 President of the General Council –
Stéphane Lenormand, President of the General Council of Saint-Pierre and Miquelon (2017–2020)
Bernard Briand, President of the General Council of Saint-Pierre and Miquelon (2020–present)
  Tromelin Island (uninhabited territory)
 administered by the administrator of the Territory of the French Southern and Antarctic Lands
  (overseas collectivity) 
 Administrator-Superior -
Thierry Queffelec, Administrator Superior of Wallis and Futuna (2019–2020)
Christophe Lotigié, Acting Administrator Superior of Wallis and Futuna (2020–2021)
 President of the Territorial Assembly –
Atoloto Kolokilagi President of the Territorial Assembly of Wallis and Futuna (2019–2020)
Nivaleta Iloai President of the Territorial Assembly of Wallis and Futuna (2020–present)
  Alo (chiefdom of Wallis and Futuna)
 King – Lino Leleivai, King of Alofi (2018–present)
  Sigave (chiefdom of Wallis and Futuna)
 King – Eufenio Takala, King of Sigave (2016–present)
  Wallis (chiefdom of Wallis and Futuna)
 Kings disputed - 
 Felice Tominiko Halagahu, King of Wallis (co-claimant, 2016–present) or
 Patalione Kanimoa, King of Wallis (co-claimant, 2016–present)

Netherlands 
  (autonomous territory)
 Governor – Alfonso Boekhoudt, Governor of Aruba (2017–present)
 Prime Minister – Evelyn Wever-Croes, Prime Minister of Aruba (2017–present) 
  (special municipality)
 Lieutenant Governor – Edison Rijna, Lieutenant Governor of Bonaire (2014–present)
  (autonomous territory)
 Governor – Lucille George-Wout, Governor of Curaçao (2013–present)
 Prime Minister – Eugene Rhuggenaath, Prime Minister of Curaçao (2017–2021)
  (special municipality)
 Lieutenant Governor – Jonathan G. A. Johnson, Lieutenant Governor of Saba (2008–present)	
  (special municipality)
 Government commissioner–
Mike Franco, Government commissioner of Sint Eustatius (2018–200)
Marnix van Rij, Government commissioner of Sint Eustatius (2020–2021)	
   (autonomous territory)
 Governor – Eugene Holiday, Governor of Sint Maarten (2010–present)
 Prime Minister - Silveria Jacobs, Acting Prime Minister of Sint Maarten (2019–present)

New Zealand 
  (self-governing territory)
 High Commissioner –
Rachel Bennett, Acting High Commissioner of the Cook Islands (2019–2020)
Heléna Cook, Acting High Commissioner of the Cook Islands (2020)
Tui Dewes, High Commissioner of the Cook Islands (2020–present)
 Queen's Representative – Tom Marsters, Queen's Representative of the Cook Islands (2013–present)
 Prime Minister 
Henry Puna, Prime Minister of the Cook Islands (2010–2020)
Mark Brown, Prime Minister of the Cook Islands (2020–present) 
  (associated state)
 High Commissioner –
Kirk Yates, High Commissioner of Niue (2018–2020)
Nigel Ewels, Acting High Commissioner of Niue (2020)
Helen Tunnah, High Commissioner of Niue (2020–present)
 Premier –
Toke Talagi, Premier of Niue (2008–2020)
Dalton Tagelagi, Premier of Niue (2020–present)
  Ross Dependency (New Zealand Antarctic Territory)  (territory)
 administered by the New Zealand Antarctic Division
 the New Zealand Antarctic claim has not been recognised by the United Nations, US, Russia, or by most other countries
	
  (territory)
 Administrator – Ross Ardern, Administrator of Tokelau (2018–present)
 Head of Government –
Kerisiano Kalolo, Head of Government of Tokelau (2019–2020)
Fofo Tuisano, Head of Government of Tokelau (2020-2021)

Norway 
  Bouvet Island (territory) 
 administered by the Polar Department of the Ministry of Justice and Public Security from Oslo
  Jan Mayen (territory)
 administered by the governor of Nordland county in the Kingdom of Norway
  Peter I Island (territory) 
 administered by the Polar Department of the Ministry of Justice and Public Security from Oslo
  Queen Maud Land (territory) 
 administered by the Polar Department of the Ministry of Justice and Public Security from Oslo
 the Norwegian Antarctic claim has not been recognized by the United Nations, US, Russia, or by most other countries
	
  Svalbard (territory) 
 Governor – Kjerstin Askholt, Governor of Svalbard (2015–2021)

Portugal 
  (autonomous region)
 Representative of the (Portuguese) Republic – Pedro Catarino, Representative of the Republic in Azores (2011–present)
 President of the Government – 
Vasco Cordeiro, President of the Government of the Azores (2012–2020)
José Manuel Bolieiro, President of the Government of the Azores (2020–present)
  (autonomous region)
 Representative of the (Portuguese) Republic – Irineu Barreto, Representative of the Republic in Madeira (2011–present)
 President of the Government – Miguel Albuquerque, President of the Government of the Madeira (2015–present)

Spain 
  Alborán Island (uninhabited territory)	 
 administered by the Ayuntamiento de Almería the Comarca of Almería of the Kingdom of Spain
  Alhucemas Islands (uninhabited territory)
 administered by the Spanish Government
  (autonomous community)
 Government-Delegate –
Juan Salvador León Ojeda, Government Delegate in the Canary Islands (2019– 2020)
Anselmo Pestana Padrón, Government Delegate in the Canary Islands (2020– present)
 President - Ángel Víctor Torres, President of the Canary Islands (2019–present)
  (autonomous city)
 Government-Delegate – Salvadora del Carmen Mateos Estudillo, Government Delegate in Ceuta (2018–present)
 Mayor-President – Juan Jesús Vivas, Mayor-President of Ceuta (2001–present)
  Chafarinas Islands (uninhabited territory)
 administered by the Spanish Government
  (autonomous city)
 Government Delegate – Sabrina Moh Abdelkader, Government Delegate in Melilla (2018–present)
 Mayor-President – Eduardo de Castro González, Mayor-President of Melilla (2019–present)
  Peñón de Vélez de la Gomera (uninhabited territory)
 administered by the Spanish Government

South Africa 
  Prince Edward Islands (uninhabited territory)
 administered by the Director of Southern Ocean and Antarctic Support of the South African ministry for Branch of Oceans and Coasts of the Department of Environmental Affairs

United Kingdom / British Crown 
  Akrotiri and Dhekelia (Overseas Territory)
 Administrator - Rob Thomson, Administrator of Akrotiri and Dhekelia (2019–present)
  (Overseas Territory)
 Governor –
Tim Foy, Governor of Anguilla (2017–2020)
Perin Bradley, Acting Governor of Anguilla (2020–2021)
 Premier –
Victor Banks, Premier of Anguilla (2019–2020)
Ellis Webster, Premier of Anguilla (2020–present)
  (Overseas Territory)
 Governor –
John Rankin, Governor of Bermuda (2016–2020)
Alison Crocket, Acting Governor of Bermuda (2020)
Rena Lalgie, Governor of Bermuda (2020–present)
 Premier – David Burt, Premier of Bermuda (2017–present)
  (Overseas Territory)
 Commissioner – Ben Merrick, Commissioner for the British Antarctic Territory (2017–2021)
 Administrator – Stuart Doubleday, Administrator of the British Antarctic Territory (2018–present)
 the British Antarctic claim has not been recognised by the United Nations, US, Russia, or by most other countries
	
  (Chagos Islands) (Overseas Territory)
 Commissioner – Ben Merrick, Commissioner for the British Indian Ocean Territory (2017–2021)
 Administrator –
 Linsey Billing, Administrator of British Indian Ocean Territory (2017–2020)
 Kit Pyman, Administrator of British Indian Ocean Territory (2020–present)
  (Overseas Territory)	 
 Governor – Augustus Jaspert, Governor of the British Virgin Islands (2017–2021)
 Premier – Andrew Fahie, Premier of the British Virgin Islands (2019–2022)
  (Overseas Territory)
 Governor – Martyn Roper, Governor of the Cayman Islands (2018–present)
 Premier – Alden McLaughlin, Premier of the Cayman Islands (2013–2021)
  (Overseas Territory)
 Governor – Nigel Phillips, Governor of the Falkland Islands (2017–2022)
 Chief Executive – Barry Rowland, Chief Executive of the Falkland Islands (2016–2021)
  (Overseas Territory)
 Governor –
Edward Davis, Governor of Gibraltar (2016–2020)
 Nick Pyle, Acting Governor of Gibraltar (2020)
 David Steel, Governor of Gibraltar (2020–present)
 Chief Minister – Fabian Picardo, Chief Minister of Gibraltar (2011–present)
  (Crown dependency)
 Monarch – Elizabeth II, Duke of Normandy (1952–present)
 Lieutenant-Governor – Sir Ian Corder, Lieutenant Governor of Guernsey (2016–present)
 Bailiff –
Sir Richard Collas, Bailiff of Guernsey (2012–2020)
Richard McMahon, Bailiff of Guernsey (2020–present)
 President of the Policy and Resources Committee –
Gavin St Pier, President of the Policy and Resources Committee of Guernsey (2016–2020)
Peter Ferbrache, President of the Policy and Resources Committee of Guernsey (2020–present)
  (self-governing island of Guernsey)
 President of the States – William Tate, President of the States of Alderney (2019 – present)
  (self-governing island of Guernsey) 
 Seigneur – Christopher Beaumont, Seigneur of Sark (2016–present) 
  (Crown dependency)
 Monarch – Elizabeth II, Duke of Normandy (1952–present)
 Lieutenant-Governor – Sir Stephen Dalton, Lieutenant Governor of Jersey (2017–present)	 
 Bailiff – Tim Le Cocq, Bailiff of Jersey (2019–present)
 Chief Minister – John Le Fondré, Chief Minister of Jersey (2018–2022)
  (Crown dependency)	
 Monarch – Elizabeth II, Lord of Mann (1952–present)
 Lieutenant-Governor – Sir Richard Gozney, Lieutenant-Governor of Man (2016–2021)	
 Chief Minister – Howard Quayle, Chief Minister of the Isle of Man (2016–2021)
  (Overseas Territory)
 Governor – Andrew Pearce, Governor of Montserrat (2018–2022)
 Premier – Easton Taylor-Farrell, Premier of Montserrat (2019–present)
  (Overseas Territory) 
 Governor – Laura Clarke, Governor of the Pitcairn Islands (2018–present) 
 Administrator – 
Nicholas Kennedy, Administrator of the Pitcairn Islands (2018–2020)
Mark Tomlinson, Administrator of the Pitcairn Islands (2020–present)
 Mayor – Charlene Warren-Peu, Mayor of the Pitcairn Islands (2020–present)
  Saint Helena and Dependencies (Overseas Territory)
 Governor – Philip Rushbrook, Governor of Saint Helena (2019–2022)
  (Dependency of Saint Helena)
 Administrator–
Steven Chandler, Administrator of Ascension Island (2019–2020)
Sean Burns, Administrator of Ascension Island (2020–present)
Xander Halliwell, Acting Administrator of Ascension Island (2020–2021)
  (Dependency of Saint Helena)
 Administrator –
 Sean Burns, Administrator of Tristan da Cunha (2016–2020)
 Fiona Kilpatrick, Administrator of Tristan da Cunha (2020)
 Steve Townsend, Administrator of Tristan da Cunha (2020)
 Fiona Kilpatrick, Administrator of Tristan da Cunha (2020)
 Steve Townsend, Administrator of Tristan da Cunha (2020–2021)
  (Overseas Territory)
 administrated by the governor of the Falklands
  (Overseas Territory)
 Governor – Nigel Dakin, Governor of the Turks and Caicos Islands (2019–present)
 Premier – Sharlene Cartwright-Robinson, Premier of the Turks and Caicos Islands (2016–2021)

United States 
  (unincorporated territory)	 
 Governor – Lolo Matalasi Moliga, Governor of American Samoa (2013–2021)
  Baker Island (unincorporated territory)
 administrated by the US Department of the Interior
  (unincorporated territory)
 Governor – Lou Leon Guerrero, Governor of Guam (2019–present)
  Guantánamo Bay (rented naval station)
 Commander – John A. Fischer, Commander of the Guantanamo Bay Naval Station (2018–present)
  Howland Island (unincorporated territory)
 administered by the US Department of the Interior
  Jarvis Island (unincorporated territory)
 administered by the US Department of the Interior
  (unincorporated territory)
 administered by the US Department of the Interior
  Kingman Reef (unincorporated territory)
 administered by the US Department of the Interior
  Midway Atoll (unincorporated territory)
 administered by the US Department of the Interior
  Navassa Island (unincorporated territory)
 administered by the US Department of the Interior
  (Commonwealth/unincorporated territory)
 Governor – Ralph Torres, Governor of the Northern Mariana Islands (2015–present)
  Palmyra Atoll (incorporated territory)
 administered by the US Department of the Interior
  (Commonwealth/unincorporated territory)
 Governor – Wanda Vázquez Garced, Governor of Puerto Rico (2019–2021)
  (unincorporated territory)
 Governor – Albert Bryan, Governor of the United States Virgin Islands (2019–present)
  (unincorporated territory)	
 administered by the US Department of the Interior

Others 
  (territory with international status under the regulations of Antarctic Treaty, signed by 50 states; uninhabited territory)
 Executive-Secretary – Albert Lluberas Bonaba (Uruguay)), Executive Secretary of Antarctic Treaty Secretariat (2017–present)	
 Marie Byrd Land
 unclaimed territory in Antarctica
 Paracel Islands
 occupied by the People's Republic of China; claimed by Vietnam and the Republic of China (Taiwan)
 Spratly Islands
 claimed in their entirety by the People's Republic of China, the Republic of China (Taiwan), and Vietnam; portions claimed by Malaysia and the Philippines; about 45 islands are occupied by relatively small numbers of military forces from the People's Republic of China, Malaysia, the Philippines, the Republic of China (Taiwan), and Vietnam; Brunei has established a fishing zone that overlaps a southern reef, but has not made any formal claim

See also
List of current dependent territory leaders

External links 
 Rulers—a list of rulers throughout time and places

Dependent territories
Lists of governors and heads of sub-national entities